Razumnyy ("Reasonable") was a 1135 Burevestnik-class ("Petrel") Large Anti-Submarine Ship (BPK) or 'Krivak' class frigate that served with the Soviet and Russian Navies. Launched on 20 July 1973, the vessel operated as part of the Pacific Fleet, as a dedicated anti-submarine vessel, with an armament built around the Metel Anti-Ship Complex. The vessel undertook a number of tours, visiting the People's Democratic Republic of Yemen and India. The ship was decommissioned on 16 March 1998 and subsequently disarmed ready to be broken up before the end of the year.

Design and development
Razumnyy was one of twenty-one Project 1135 ships launched between 1970 and 1981. Project 1135, the Burevestnik ("Petrel") class, was envisaged by the Soviet Navy as a less expensive complement to the Project 1134A Berkut A (NATO reporting name 'Kresta II') and Project 1134B Berkut B (NATO reporting name 'Kara') classes of ships. The design was originally given to TsKB-340, which had designed the earlier Project 159 (NATO reporting name 'Petya') and Project 35 (NATO reporting name 'Mirka') classes. However, the expansion in the United States Navy ballistic missile submarine fleet, and the introduction of longer-ranged and more accurate submarine-launched ballistic missiles led to a revisit of the project, which was transferred to TsKB-53 in Leningrad.  The design, by N. P. Sobolov, combined a powerful missile armament with good seakeeping for a blue water role and shared the same BPK designation as the larger ships. This was amended to Guard Ship (SKR) from 28 July 1977 to reflect the change in Soviet strategy of creating protected areas for friendly submarines close to the coast. NATO forces called the new class 'Krivak' class frigates.

Power was provided by two M7 sets, each consisting of a combination of a  DK59 and a  M62 gas turbine combined in a COGAG installation and driving one fixed-pitch propeller. The ship's complement was 197, including 23 officers.

Armament and sensors
The ship was designed for anti-submarine warfare around four URPK-4 Metel missiles (NATO reporting name SS-N-14 'Silex'), backed up by a pair of quadruple launchers for  torpedoes and a pair of RBU-6000  Smerch-2 anti-submarine rocket launchers. Defence against aircraft was provided by forty 4K33 OSA-M (SA-N-4 'Gecko') surface to air missiles which were launched from two sets of ZIF-122 launchers, each capable of launching two missiles. Two twin  AK-726 guns were mounted aft and provision was made for carrying 18 mines.

Razumnyy had a well-equipped sensor suite, including a single MR-310A Angara-A air/surface search radar, Volga  and Don-2 navigation radars, the MP-401S Start-S ESM radar system and the Spectrum-F laser warning system. An extensive sonar complex was fitted, including MG-332 Titan-2, which was mounted in a bow radome, and MG-325 Vega. The ship was also equipped with the PK-16 decoy-dispenser system.

Construction and career
Razumnyy was laid down by on 26 June 1972 with the yard number 156 at the Yantar Shipyard in Kaliningrad and launched on 20 July 1973. The ship was named for a Russian word that can be translated reasonable, clever or sensible. The vessel was commissioned on 30 September 1974 and joined the Pacific Fleet on 11 June 1975. Almost immediately, the ship was dispatched to participate in the Okean-75 exercise, which spanned four fleets and involved over 200 other Soviet vessels.

Razumnyy had a generally uneventful service, operating in the Indian and Pacific Oceans. The vessel undertook a goodwill visit to Aden in what was then the People's Democratic Republic of Yemen between 15 and 24 August 1978. The ship also visited Mumbai, India, between 15 and 19 November 1984 along with the Project 1135M Burevestnik M (NATO reporting name 'Krivak II') class vessel . With the dissolution of the Soviet Union on 26 December 1991, the ship was transferred to the Russian Navy. Decommissioned on 16 March 1998 due to a general deterioration of the ship over the length of time in service, Razumnyy was transferred from the Navy and, by the end of the year, was completely disarmed and laid up at Petropavlovsk-Kamchatsky ready to be broken up.

References

Citations

Bibliography

 
 
 
 
 
 
 
 
 
 

1973 ships
Krivak-class frigates
Ships built in the Soviet Union
Ships built at Yantar Shipyard
Cold War frigates of the Soviet Union